The Shute Shield, known as the Charter Hall Shute Shield, is a semi-professional rugby union competition in Sydney, Australia. It is the premier club competition in New South Wales. The Shute Shield is awarded to the winning team from the Sydney premiership grand final held at the end of the club rugby season.

History
Club-based rugby football began some time before 1865. The Sydney University Football Club began in 1863 (although this date is questioned by some historians) and is the oldest existing football club outside the British Isles. The first recorded rugby season in Australia was in 1865 with Sydney University, Sydney Football Club and the Australian Club reported as playing games.

On 24 June 1874, a meeting was held between ten prominent football clubs to create a governing body to administer the game within New South Wales. The Southern Rugby Football Union was formed. The first task of the Union was to decide on a set of rules for all clubs to adhere to. Clubs were given "senior" or "junior" status which could change from season to season. Although a governing body had now been formed, there was no centrally controlled competition until many years later.

The Sydney Rugby Premiership 
Initially, a competition was loosely arranged by the Union where the clubs were in charge of organising their own matches. This would result in clubs not playing the same teams or the same number of teams. A "Premier Club of the Colony" was declared by the Union at an end of year meeting. It was not necessarily given to the team that had the best results on the field. Results mattered, but other criteria may have also been used. What these were are not known.

The year 1880 saw the Southern Rugby Football Union endure the first splintering of the football code in Australia. It was during this season that a newspaper "war" began. Discussions centred around the merits of Rugby Football, British Association Football (Soccer) and the Victorian game (Aussie Rules Football). As a result of these heated discussions, an association was formed under the Victorian rules with two strong clubs formed to play the game. No sooner than the dust had settled and another association was formed under the British Association rules. Despite this new competition, Rugby Football held sway as the premier code in Sydney.

In 1883, the Gardiner Challenge Cup was introduced with a mixture of "senior" and "junior" clubs competing. Foundation clubs included Redfern, Sydney University, Wallaroo, Newtown, Burwood, Oriental, Glebe, Balmain, St. Leonards, Parramatta, Arfoma and Paddington. The first Cup was won by Redfern who were undefeated. At the beginning of the season, a proposal was put to the Southern Rugby Union to change the rules determining how a game was decided. Prior to the 1883 season, a game was decided by the number of goals scored. The amendment that was successfully passed by the Union declared that games would be decided by number of points scored. A try was awarded 2 points, a conversion was 3 points and a goal kicked from the field of play 4 points.

Within a few years of the Gardiner Cup beginning, the Premiership had developed to become a more structured competition with a centralised list of fixtures and rounds. An official ladder was produced and maintained with points given for wins, draws and byes. By the 1890s a finals system was introduced to assist in determining the premiership winner. 

The Sydney Rugby Premiership came under the control of the Metropolitan Rugby Union, a branch of the New South Wales Rugby Football Union (formally the Southern Rugby Football Union), in 1897.

The District Competition 
As early as 1893 it had been suggested to change the current structure of the premiership to a district-based formula. In early 1900, a meeting of the Metropolitan Rugby Union was held and a recommendation to establish district football in the coming season was made. Eight clubs competed in the inaugural season: Balmain, Glebe, Newtown, South Sydney, North Sydney, Western Suburbs, Eastern Suburbs and Sydney University. The first district competition was won by Glebe who were successful in all three grade competitions.

It was during this period, in 1907, that the supremacy of the Sydney Rugby Premiership was threatened. The imminent arrival of a professional football team from New Zealand sparked heated discussion about professionalism and compensation pay for lost time at work. In August of that year, the New South Wales Rugby Football League was formed. During the following season, a professional league competition was begun. Over the next few years, players switched across to the professional competition resulting in crowd numbers falling at Union matches.

Despite this, the district competition continued to run, rebuilding its supporter base, until the outbreak of World War 1 with the last season held during 1914. With the outbreak of war, competition was suspended.

The Return of the Premiership 
At the conclusion of the war, the Sydney Rugby Premiership was recommenced. With the competition returning under the control of the NSW Rugby Football Union, only six clubs competed: Cambridge, Eastern Suburbs, Glebe-Balmain, Manly, Sydney University and YMCA. The competition remained as a district-based premiership until approximately the 1940s.

The Shute Shield 
The Shute Memorial Shield was struck in honour of the late Robert Elliott Stewart Shute, who died on 6 June 1922, aged 23, following a match at Manly Oval. Shute enlisted in April 1917 and served as a gunner in 30th Battery, Field Artillery A.I.F. during World War One.

On his return to Australia, Shute took up his engineering studies at the University of Sydney and joined the Sydney University rugby club as a front row forward in the first XV. Of Shute's death from a fractured skull and cerebral haemorrhage, the Sydney Morning Herald, Wednesday 7 June 1922 reported:
 
As a result of injuries received while playing at Manly in the Rugby football match between the team which toured New Zealand and the Next 15, Robert Elliott Shute, a front row forward in the latter team, died at a private hospital at Manly yesterday morning. The accident occurred during the latter portion of the first spell of the match. Shute secured the ball and when tackled fell heavily. He was removed to a private hospital, where it was ascertained that he was suffering from cerebral hemorrhage. Without recovering consciousness he died at 6am. A former pupil of Sydney Grammar School, Shute, who was 23 years of age, was a third year student at Sydney University and he played for the University first fifteen. He served in the AIF for four years.

The University club had the shield made following his death and donated it in 1923 to the NSWRFU to be used as a perpetual trophy for the Sydney first grade competition.

In 1966, the Sydney Rugby Union was formed to administer the running of Sydney rugby including the Shute Shield.

The NSW Championship 
In late 1986, the Sydney Rugby Union (SRU) approved a new competition structure for the Shute Shield. The SRU were concerned about the falling number of clubs involved in the lower divisions. The new structure involved distributing all teams in the three competitions evenly across three new divisions with some teams earning the right to play for the premiership in the first division.

The clubs that made up first division were opposed to the new structure and sought the opportunity to form a breakaway competition affiliated directly with the NSWRFU. This resulted in the formation of a 10 club competition called the NSW Championship, while the remaining lower division clubs remained with the SRU Championship. Both competitions ran during the 1987 and 1988 seasons.

For the 1989 season, the NSW Championship clubs returned to the SRU and the Shute Shield.

In 1992, the NSW Rugby Union again took over the administration of the Shute Shield competition. In 2011, the SRU took control of the competition once again.

Toohey's New Cup and the Australian Rugby Championship
From 2002 through 2006 the Toohey's New Cup was run to fill the void between Grade Rugby and Super Rugby in Australia. This became the Sydney Premiership competition, with the Shute Shield becoming the First Grade pre-season competition. However, in 2004 the Shute Shield was awarded to the Second Grade competition.

In 2007 the Toohey's New Cup was merged into the Shute Shield to become the Toohey's New Shute Shield when an attempt at an Australian wide domestic rugby competition, the Australian Rugby Championship, was started. The Australian Rugby Championship only lasted the one season.

Clubs

Current clubs

Promotion/relegation from Sydney rugby premiership
 After Eastwood joined the premiership in 1947, the following 11 clubs competed in the Sydney rugby premiership:
Drummoyne, Eastern Suburbs, Eastwood, Gordon, Manly, Northern Suburbs, Parramatta, Randwick, St George, Sydney University, Western Suburbs.

 After the 1951 season, Western Suburbs were relegated to the Sydney Sub-Districts competition.  
 The premiership became the 1st division when a 2nd division was created in 1962.

 In 1966, Western Suburbs and University of NSW were promoted to 1st division from the 2nd division.

 In 1971, Warringah and Port Hacking were promoted to 1st division from the 2nd division.

 In 1976, Hornsby and Macquarie University were promoted to 1st division from the 2nd division.

 After the 1978 season, the Sydney Rugby Union reduced the 1st division to 10 teams, but introduced automatic annual promotion and relegation between the 1st and 2nd divisions.

 The following changes occurred for the following seasons.

 1979 Relegated clubs – Hornsby, Macquarie University, Port Hacking, St George, Drummoyne, Sydney University
 1980 Promoted clubs – Sydney University, St George. Relegated clubs – University of NSW, Western Suburbs.
 1981 Promoted clubs – Western Suburbs, Hornsby. Relegated clubs – Eastern Suburbs, Eastwood.
 1982 Promoted clubs – Eastern Suburbs, Eastwood. Relegated clubs – Hornsby, Northern Suburbs.
 1983 Promoted club – Port Hacking. Relegated club – Sydney University.
 1984 Promoted club – Sydney University. Relegated club – Eastern Suburbs.
 1985 Promoted club – Eastern Suburbs. Relegated club – St George.
 1986 Promoted club – St George. Relegated club – Port Hacking
 Automatic promotion and relegation ended after the 1986 season.
 In 1989, Southern Districts took the place of St George (who had merged with Port Hacking to form the new club).
 In 1990 Northern Suburbs were promoted to 1st division.
 In 1991 Drummoyne were promoted to 1st division.
 Before the 1992 season, Hornsby took legal action against the Sydney Rugby Union seeking promotion in place of Drummoyne but failed, at least partly because the NSWRU had taken over the running of the Sydney rugby premiership for the 1992 season.
 The 2nd division ended after the 1992 season, with the NSWRU merging the 2nd division into the NSW Suburban RU competition.
 In 1995 Drummoyne were dropped from the Sydney (now NSWRU) premiership and Canberra, Newcastle and Penrith were added.
 In 2000 Newcastle were dropped from the NSWRU premiership.
 In 2001 Canberra were dropped from the NSWRU premiership.
 In 2004 Canberra were re-admitted to the NSWRU premiership.
 In 2006 Canberra were dropped from the NSWRU premiership.
 In 2007 Illawarra (Illawarriors) were admitted to the NSWRU premiership, but played only that season.
 In 2018, a few rounds into the season, Penrith were dropped from the (again) Sydney rugby premiership.
 In 2020, Penrith and Hunter (formerly Newcastle) Wildfires were re-admitted to the Sydney rugby premiership.
 Ahead of the 2022 season, Penrith were dropped again from the Sydney rugby premiership.

Former clubs
Below is a list of some of the clubs that have once competed in the Sydney rugby premiership.

The following clubs also played in the Sydney premiership in the period after 1900:

 Cambridge (1919)
 YMCA (1919, 1923-1929)
 Mosman (1920)
 GPS Old Boys (1921-1924)
 Petersham (1922)
 Police (1929)
 Illawarra (Illawarriors) (2006 pre-season Shute Shield, 2007 Toohey New Cup)

Note: The Sydney premiership became the 1st division when a 2nd division was added for 31 seasons from 1962-1992.

Media coverage 
From 1957 until 2014, the Australian Broadcasting Corporation had broadcast the Match of the Day from the Shute Shield competition in NSW/ACT every Saturday afternoon and replayed nationally on Tuesday mornings. The ABC ended its 57-year partnership with the competition at the completion of the 2014 season, following the Australian Government's decision to cut funding to the national broadcaster.

On 17 March 2015, Sydney Rugby formally announced that the Seven Network would become the new free-to-air Match of the Day broadcasters of the Shute Shield in NSW, commencing on 21 March on 7TWO showing a match between Eastern Suburbs and Gordon. The Prime Network broadcasts to regional areas of NSW. This agreement has since been renewed, with the current contract running through the 2024 season.

On November 9 2020, Nine Network confirmed their broadcast deal with Rugby Australia, giving them the rights to the Shute Shield. Beginning in 2021, 4 games a season will be televised live on one of Nine's free-to-air channels. The remainder of the games will be broadcast live on streaming service Stan.

Competition format 
The competition format currently involves an 18-week round-robin competition which is followed by a three-week play-off series culminating in a grand final. The playoffs are contested by the top six placed teams following the round-robin. The first week of the play-offs sees 1st play 6th, 2nd play 5th and 3rd play 4th. The lowest two losers are eliminated and the three winners plus the highest ranked loser proceed to week 2 of the play-offs. The two winners from week 2 proceed to the Grand Final in week 3.

Premiership results

 Up until 1886, the premiers were declared by the Union at an end-of-year meeting. It is not clear how the premiership was decided at these meetings.
 From 1886 to 1889, the season consisted of a round of games organised as a round-robin, with the premiership awarded to the team who finished the season at the top of the ladder. However, in 1887 there was a final to decide the premier. 
 In 1890 and 1891, there was a final played after a round robin. 
 From 1892–1898, after the round-robin first round, there were knockout competitions held to determine the winners of the RAS Shield and the SCG Trophy, with the results counting for premiership points and with the premiership awarded to the team who finished the season at the top of the ladder. In 1899 the results of the knockout matches did not count for premiership points. 
 From 1900 onwards, the season consisted of either one or two rounds of round-robin games. The premiership was awarded to the team who finished the season at the top of the ladder. After 1907 there was a final played in some years after the round-robin.
 In 1919 and 1920, the premiership returned to the previous structure of a round-robin. Again, the premiership was awarded to the team who finished the season at the top of the ladder. 
 From 1921, there was a final played in some years after the round robin.
 From 1932, the premiership was decided by a Grand Final.
 For 1987-88 a NSW Championship existed alongside the Shute Shield. The first grade teams played for the rebel NSW Championship, while the Shield contained clubs from the lower grades.
 From 2002 to 2006, the Shute Shield was awarded for a pre-season competition.

The Premier Club of the Colony

The Gardiner Challenge Cup

The Royal Agricultural Society Shield & The Sydney Cricket Ground Trophy

The District Premiership

The Shute Shield

The NSW Championship

The Sydney Rugby Premiership

Individual awards

Ken Catchpole Medal

Fairfax/Herald Cup

See also
Australian club championship rugby union
List of Australian club rugby union competitions
New South Wales Rugby Union
New South Wales Waratahs
List of oldest rugby union competitions

Notes

References

External links

Sports competitions in Sydney
Rugby union competitions in New South Wales
Recurring sporting events established in 1923
1923 establishments in Australia
Sports leagues established in 1923